Platygyriella is a genus of moss in the family Hypnaceae. It was described by Jules Cardot in 1854. It occurs mostly in the Americas (especially Mexico), parts of Africa, and parts of Asia.

Species 
It has a total of 9 species:

References

Hypnaceae
Moss genera
Plants described in 1854
Taxa named by Jules Cardot